Ophyx excisa is a moth of the family Erebidae first described by Gustaaf Hulstaert in 1924. It is found in Papua, Indonesia. The habitat consists of hot lowland forests.

References

Ophyx
Moths described in 1924
Moths of Indonesia